Torch is an unincorporated community in Ripley County, in the U.S. state of Missouri.

The community is located on Missouri Route H between Glenn to the southwest and Hemenway to the northeast.

History
A post office called Torch was established in 1920, and remained in operation until 1954. According to tradition, a local lumber mill regularly torched their scrap wood outside, hence the name Torch.

References

Unincorporated communities in Ripley County, Missouri
Unincorporated communities in Missouri